"I Like Dat" is a song by American rapper and singer T-Pain and American singer Kehlani. It was released on May 14, 2021, through Nappy Boy and Empire. The song is a "sequel" of T-Pain's song "Buy U a Drank (Shawty Snappin')" (2007).

Background
In early May 2021, T-Pain went live on Instagram with Mark Zuckerberg to discuss Zuckerberg sending him messages. At the end of the livestream, T-Pain introduced Kehlani and announced their collaboration. In a statement, T-Pain expressed that Kehlani "has been one of the best to work with", saying: "[They] did [their] thing on this track and made it what it is."

Composition
The song is written in the key of F♯ Minor, with a tempo of 88 beats per minute. The Song's intro is taken from a sample of T-Pain's 2007 hit single Buy U a Drank (Shawty Snappin') released 14 years earlier.

Music video
An accompanying "cowboy-style" music video was released on June 24, 2021, and directed by Christian Breslauer. The video features T-Pain arriving in a town "on his horse and buggy to sell his self-made "drank" to the townsfolk". Kehlani plays his associate, a townswoman "downing [their] drink and making out with a fellow townswoman, which arouses the gunslingers". T-Pain makes a profit and performs the song with Kehlani in a saloon before they set off for another town.

Remix
The official remix features American rapper Bia and was released October 1, 2021.

Charts

Weekly charts

Year-end charts

Certifications

Release history

References

2021 singles
2021 songs
T-Pain songs
Kehlani songs
Empire Distribution singles
Songs written by T-Pain
Songs written by Kehlani